Lohagara is an upazila of Chattogram District in Chattogram Division, Bangladesh. Lohagara is situated between Chattogram and Cox's Bazar. It is one of the largest and most densely populated upazilas of Bangladesh.

Etymology
In 1660, Mughal prince Shah Shuja took shelter in the Kingdom of Arakan to escape from Mir Jumla II. While heading to Arakan, he stayed in a beautiful hilly place (present-day Chunati) between Chittagong and Cox's Bazar for a few days. At the time of departure, he engraved an iron bar in that place as a sign. It is thought that because of engraving iron bar by Shah Shuja the area is called 'Lohagara' since 'Loha' means 'iron'.

History
Lohagara was once under Satkania Upazila. Lohagara thana was formed in 1981 and it was turned into an upazila in 1983.

Geography

It is bordered by Satkania Upazila on the north, Chakaria and Lama Upazilas on the south, Bandarban Sadar and Lama Upazilas on the east and Banshkhali Upazila on the west. The noted canals are Tonkaboti, Dolu and Hangor.

Parks and greenery
Chunati Wildlife Sanctuary
Padua Forest Range
Nasim Park, PUTİBİLA
Chambi Lake, Chunati

Demographics

According to the 2011 Bangladesh census, Lohagara Upazila had 52,873 households and a population of 279,913, 10.7% of whom lived in urban areas. 12.1% of the population was under the age of 5. The literacy rate (age 7 and over) was 49.2%, compared to the national average of 51.8%.

Points of interest

Chunti Khan Mosque 
Upazila Memorial Museum
 Central Mosque
Hafez Para Jame Mosque, PUTİBİLA
Gupta Landlord House (Padua)
Gupta Landlord House (Aduonagor)

Administration
Lohagara thana was turned into an upazila in 1983.

Lohagara Upazila is divided into nine union parishads: Adhunagar, Amirabad, PUTİBİLA, Barahatia, Charamba, Chunati, Kalauzan, Lohagara, & Padua. The union parishads are subdivided into 40 mauzas and 43 villages.

Education
There are three kamil madrasas, two degree colleges (two honors courses), one mohila College (the only government college in Lohagara Upazila), nine fazil madrasas, one technical college, one school and college, 1 alim madrasas, 25 secondary schools (1 govt), 18 dakhil madrasas, two quami madrasas, 10 lower secondary schools, 105 primary schools, 43 ebtedi madrasas, and 30 kindergartens.

Colleges and universities
Alhaj Mostafizur Rahman University College
Bara Aulia Degree College
Mostafa Begum Girls Business Management College
Chunati Government Women's College
Ayub Foundation Technical College

Schools
Lohagara Shahpir Pilot High School (1966)
South Satkania [Amirabad] Golambari Government Model High School (1937)
Amirabad Janakalyan High School (1970)
North Amirabad M B High School (1932)
Charamba High School(1968)
Lohagara Suckchuri Uzir vita 
Putibila High School (1968)
Gourstan High School, Putibila
M. H. Nurul Alam Chowdhury Ideal High School (1994)
Kalauzan Sukchari Gorsundar High School (1945)
Adhunagar High School (1961)
Padua A.C.M. High School (1963)
Mustafa Begum Girls High School
Chunati High School
B G Senerhat High School
Sukchari High School (1986)
Kalauzan Dr. Yakub Bazlur Rahman Sikder High School
Uttar Padua High School (1996)
Lohagara Ideal School & College
Iqra Abdul Jabbar High School (1988)
Rashiderghona High School
Barahatia Adarsha High School.(1973)

Madrashas
Amirabad Sufia Aliya Madrasah
Rajghata Hossainia Azizul Uloom Madrasah, Amirabad
Lohagara Islamia (Degree) Madrasah (1945)
Adhunagor Islamia Kamil Madrasha, Adhunagor
Barahatia Malpukuria Miaskatul Ulum Madrasah (1941)
Chunati Hakimia Kamil (M.A) Madrasah
 Charamba jame ul ulom dakil Madrasha(1989)
Al-Ihsan Academy, Lohagara (1997)
South Sukchari Shah Abdul Khalek Fazil (degree) Madrasah
Kalauzan Shah Rashidia Fazil (degree) Madrasah
Barohatia Darul Quran Academy (2015)
 Putibila Hamedia Fazil (degree) Madrasah
 Allama Fazlullah (RAH.) Ideal Dhakil Madrasah Narischa (2001)
 Darul Arquam Academy (Dakhil Madrasah charamba) 2001
Noarbila Kaderia Adarsha Dakhil Madrasah, Charamba

Notable residents
 Mia Mohammad Zainul Abedin, Military Secretary to the Prime Minister (2011-2019), was born at Chunti village in 1960.
 Bulbul Chowdhury, pioneer of modern dance in Bangladesh, born in Chunati in 1919
 Major Nazmul Huq, Sector Commander, 7th sector of Bangladesh Liberation War (March to August 1971), born at Amirabad village in 1938

References